Konstantin Ivanovich Gorbatov (– 24 May 1945) was a Russian post-impressionist painter.

Biography
Gorbatov was born in Stavropol in the Samara province. He lived in Riga from 1896 to 1903, and studied civil engineering before painting. Gorbatov moved to St. Petersburg in 1904 and studied at the Baron Stieglitz Central School for Technical Draftsmanship. He initially entered the architecture department of the Imperial Academy of Arts before switching to painting that he studied under Nikolay Nikanorovich Dubovskoy. Gorbatov received a scholarship and studied art in Rome and Capri. He returned to St. Petersburg and participated in the Peredvizhniki exhibitions.

Gorbatov left Russia permanently in 1922 following the Russian Revolution of 1917 and settled on the Italian island of Capri. He moved to Berlin in 1926, where he remained until his death. Gorbatov became a member of a Russian emgiree artistic circle that included Leonid Pasternak, Vadim Falileyev, Ivan Myasoyedov. He became a well-known established artist. Gorbatov traveled throughout Europe during the late 1930s, visited Palestine and Syria in 1934 and 1935, and often came by Italy. Gorbatov's art became unneeded in Nazi Germany and the family soon became impoverished. As a Russian émigré, he was forbidden to leave Germany during World War II. Gorbatov died shortly after the allied victory over Germany on 12 May 1945. His wife committed suicide on 17 June 1945.

Gorbatov bequeathed to the Academy of Arts in Leningrad. The works were delivered to the Moscow Regional Museum of history and Arts near the New Jerusalem Monastery, where they have since been exhibited.

Selected works

References

External links

19th-century painters from the Russian Empire
Russian male painters
20th-century Russian painters
Post-impressionist painters
1876 births
1945 deaths
Soviet emigrants to Germany
19th-century male artists from the Russian Empire
20th-century Russian male artists